Merle Edwin Wagoner (April 15, 1894 – August 18, 1971) was an American football, basketball, baseball, track, and tennis coach and college athletics administrator. He served as the head football coach at Kent State College—now known as Kent State University— from 1925 to 1932, compiling a record of 15–33–9. Wagoner was the head basketball coach at Kent State from 1925 to 1933, tallying a mark of 43–81, and the school's head baseball coach from 1926 to 1933, amassing a record of 27–34. He was the Kent State's athletic director from 1925 to 1933 and also coached track and tennis there.

Wagoner was born in Beaver Falls, Pennsylvania and attended Mercersburg Academy in Mercersburg, Pennsylvania. He died of an apparent heart attack on August 18, 1971, at St. Joseph Hospital in Phoenix, Arizona.

Head coaching record

Football

References

External links
 

1894 births
1971 deaths
Kent State Golden Flashes athletic directors
Kent State Golden Flashes baseball coaches
Kent State Golden Flashes football coaches
Kent State Golden Flashes men's basketball coaches
College tennis coaches in the United States
College track and field coaches in the United States
Mercersburg Academy alumni
People from Beaver Falls, Pennsylvania
Sportspeople from the Pittsburgh metropolitan area
Coaches of American football from Pennsylvania
Baseball coaches from Pennsylvania
Basketball coaches from Pennsylvania